Jeffrey Hoogland (born 16 March 1993) is a Dutch track cyclist. He represented his nation in three editions of the 2013, 2014 and 2015 UCI Track Cycling World Championships. At the 2015 UEC European Track Championships, he collected a total of three gold medals, individually in the sprint and the 1 km time trial, and with Nils van 't Hoenderdaal and Hugo Haak in the team sprint.

He is a 3-time World Champion in the team sprint, 2018, 2019 and 2020, World Champion in the 1-km time trial in 2018, where he set a new world record at sea level. Hoogland won a silver medal at the 2020 Summer Olympics in the sprint event and was a part of the team that won a gold medal in the team sprint competition, setting the new Olympic record in the finals.

Career achievements

Major championship results

References

External links
 
 
 
 
 
 

1993 births
Living people
Dutch male cyclists
Dutch track cyclists
UCI Track Cycling World Champions (men)
Dutch cyclists at the UCI Track Cycling World Championships
Olympic cyclists of the Netherlands
Olympic medalists in cycling
Olympic gold medalists for the Netherlands
Olympic silver medalists for the Netherlands
Cyclists at the 2016 Summer Olympics
Cyclists at the 2020 Summer Olympics
Medalists at the 2020 Summer Olympics
European Games medalists in cycling
European Games gold medalists for the Netherlands
Cyclists at the 2019 European Games
European Championships (multi-sport event) gold medalists
People from Hellendoorn
Cyclists from Overijssel
20th-century Dutch people
21st-century Dutch people